Leskensky District is an administrative and a municipal district (raion), one of the ten in the Kabardino-Balkar Republic, Russia. It is located in the southeast of the republic. Its administrative center is the rural locality (a selo) of Anzorey. As of the 2010 Census, the total population of the district was 27,840, with the population of Anzorey accounting for 23.5% of that number.

History
The district was established in 2003.

Administrative and municipal status
Within the framework of administrative divisions, Leskensky District is one of the ten in the Kabardino-Balkar Republic and has administrative jurisdiction over all of its nine rural localities. As a municipal division, the district is incorporated as Leskensky Municipal District. Its nine rural localities are incorporated into nine rural settlements within the municipal district. The selo of Anzorey serves as the administrative center of both the administrative and municipal district.

References

Notes

Sources

Districts of Kabardino-Balkaria
